Sphaerodactylus underwoodi, also known commonly as Underwood's least gecko or the Turks Islands geckolet, is a small species of lizard in the family Sphaerodactylidae. The species is endemic to Grand Turk Island.

Etymology
The specific name, underwoodi, is in honor of British herpetologist Garth Leon Underwood.

Habitat
The preferred habitat of S. underwoodi is shrubland.

Reproduction
S. underwoodi is oviparous.

References

Further reading
Rösler H (2000). "Kommentierte Liste der rezent, subrezent und fossil bekannten Geckotaxa (Reptilia: Gekkonomorpha)". Gekkota 2: 28–153. (Sphaerodactylus underwoodi, p. 114). (in German).
Schwartz A (1968). "The Geckos (Sphaerodactylus) of the Southern Bahama Islands". The Annals of the Carnegie Museum 39: 227–271. (Sphaerodactylus underwoodi, new species, p. 250).
Schwartz A, Henderson RW (1991). Amphibians and Reptiles of the West Indies: Descriptions, Distributions, and Natural History. Gainesville, Florida: University of Florida Press. 720 pp. . (Sphaerodactylus underwoodi, p. 543).
Schwartz A, Thomas R (1975). A Check-list of West Indian Amphibians and Reptiles. Carnegie Museum of Natural History Special Publication No. 1. Pittsburgh, Pennsylvania: Carnegie Museum of Natural History. 216 pp. (Sphaerodactylus underwoodi, p. 163).

Sphaerodactylus
Reptiles described in 1968